The 2007 World Table Tennis Championships men's doubles was the 49th edition of the men's doubles championship. The event took place in Zagreb, Croatia between May 21 and May 27, 2007.

Chen Qi and Ma Lin won the title after defeating Wang Hao and Wang Liqin in the final by four sets to two.

Seeds

  Chen Qi /  Ma Lin (champions)
  Wang Hao /  Wang Liqin (final)
  Timo Boll /  Christian Süß (quarterfinals)
  Ko Lai Chak /  Li Ching (semifinals)
  Hao Shuai /  Ma Long (third round)
  Lee Jung-woo /  Oh Sang-eun (quarterfinals)
  Cheung Yuk /  Leung Chu Yan (second round)
  Aleksandar Karakašević /  Slobodan Grujić (quarterfinals)
  Chen Weixing /  Robert Gardos (second round)
  Gao Ning /  Yang Zi (second round)
  Alexey Smirnov /  Fedor Kuzmin (third round)
  Lucjan Błaszczyk /  Wang Zengyi (third round)
  Lee Jung-sam /  Ryu Seung-min (third round)
  Michael Maze /  Finn Tugwell (third round)
  Joo Sae-hyuk /  Kim Jung-hoon (second round)
  Seiya Kishikawa /  Jun Mizutani (quarterfinals)

Finals

Main draw

Top half

Section 1

Section 2

Bottom half

Section 3

Section 4

References

External links
Drawsheet - Men's doubles

-